Naeem Ahmad Khan (12 April 1928 – 29 September 2013), was a Pakistani nuclear physicist and a professor of physics who was known for his work in developing techniques using the solid-state nuclear track detector and solid-state nuclear magnetic resonance. Although he worked with the Government of Pakistan for most of his career, he also taught physics at a number of Pakistani universities and was the civilian scientist of the Pakistan Air Force (PAF) until his death.

Early life
Khan was born in Hoshiarpur, Punjab, British India on 12 April 1928. He enrolled at the University of Delhi and attended St. Stephen's College, where he received a Bachelor of Arts (BA) degree with honors in mathematics in 1946. Khan then joined the Indian Meteorological Department (Indian Met Office), transferring to the Pakistan Meteorological Department after the 1947 Independence of Pakistan.

Khan left the Pakistan Meteorological Department in 1948 to attend Sindh University in Hyderabad, where he received a Master of Arts (MA) degree in mathematics in 1950. He joined the Pakistan Air Force (PAF) the following year, was commissioned as a lieutenant, and was a senior instructor in Air Force education units. Becoming interested in physics, Khan transferred to the Air Force Reserve to attend the physics program at Karachi University in 1953.

Khan received a Master of Science (MSc) degree in physics (with research focused on mass spectroscopy) from Karachi University in 1955, and obtained funding from the Pakistan Atomic Energy Commission (PAEC) to pursue doctoral studies in physics in the United Kingdom the following year. He attended the University of Manchester and received a Doctor of Philosophy (PhD) degree in nuclear physics in 1958. In 1959, he became a fellow of the Physical Society of London.

Career

Pakistan Atomic Energy Commission
Khan returned from England and joined the Pakistan Atomic Energy Commission (PAEC) in 1960. Promoted as a scientific officer the following year, his early research focused on low-energy nuclear reactions. Khan then returned to the United Kingdom, where he conducted his postdoctoral research at the Atomic Energy Research Establishment in Harwell (funded by the PAEC and the United Kingdom Atomic Energy Authority). He went to the United States in 1962, and was a research fellow at the Franklin Institute in Philadelphia in 1964 and 1965.

Khan returned to Pakistan in 1965, and was a senior scientific officer at the PAEC Minerals Center in Lahore; he became its principal scientific officer in 1967. He formed the Nuclear Physics Group, with mechanical engineer Hafeez Qureshi and physicists Bashiruddin Mahmud and Samar Mubarakmand as key members. The Nuclear Physics Division made fundamental calculations on neutron scattering through the gas centrifuge process before it was disbanded by 1969.

Khan was posted to the PAEC's administration in 1970, and was its director of training and international affairs before becoming secretary. His research continued to focus on developing a solid-state nuclear track detector, and he aided work on neutron scattering; in 1968, he published an article on the subject with Qureshi. Khan was appointed director of the Research Technological Department in 1975, directing the Nuclear Physics Division before becoming director of the Institute of Nuclear Science and Technology (Pakistan's national laboratory) in 1977.

Academic and government work
Khan became chairman of the Pakistan Council of Scientific and Industrial Research (PCSIR) in 1984, where he remained until he became technical adviser to the Committee on Scientific and Technological Cooperation (COMSTECH) in 1989. He was a founding fellow of the Islamic World Academy of Sciences in 1986, promoting science and technology in the Islamic world. Khan left COMSTECH in 1996, and was vice-president of the Pakistan Academy of Sciences (PAS) until the following year. 

In 1997, Khan became a professor of physics at Karachi University, Sindh University in Hyderabad, Quaid-e-Azam University in Islamabad, Punjab University in Lahore, and the Air University in Islamabad. He supervised five doctoral candidates in physics at Punjab University who were funded by the PAEC.

Khan also worked for the Ministry of Energy (MoE), and briefly served on the advisory board of the Hydrocarbon Development Institute of Pakistan. In 2007, he became the Pakistan Air Force's (PAF) civilian scientist, instructing its pilots on aerodynamics and meteorology at the Pakistan Air Force Academy in Risalpur. Khan died in Islamabad on 29 September 2013, and is buried there. Physicist N. M. Butt published a eulogy and obituary for the PAS in October 2013.

Research in physics
Khan's research revolved around the biological applications of nuclear physics. He worked in fission production calculations and energy measurement through the solid-state nuclear track detector (SSNTD), which he pioneered in 1989 with "Solid State Nuclear Track Detection: A Useful Tool for Basic and Applied Science Research" (co-authored with Hameed Ahmad Khan, another PAEC scientist. During the 1980s, Khan supervised the SSNTD project with CERN's Nuclear Engineering Division particle accelerators. He played key roles in the establishment of the SSTND laboratory and the development of the Pakistan Institute of Nuclear Science & Technology (PINSTECH)'s nuclear accelerator and particle detectors.

In 1989, Khan and his team of PINSTECH scientists studied the behaviour of 960 MeV/nucleon uranium-238 (238U) ions which passed through a stack of CR-39 (39CR) detectors. They had observed that the uranium ions underwent binary fission and broke into protons, alpha particles, and heavy ions while moving through the stack.

References

External links
https://web.archive.org/web/20070810193641/http://www.paspk.org/fellow5.htm
https://web.archive.org/web/20110610134200/http://www.ias-worldwide.org/profiles/prof37.htm
Papers

1928 births
2013 deaths
Academics of the University of Manchester
Alumni of the University of Manchester
Fellows of Pakistan Academy of Sciences
Indian emigrants to Pakistan
Indian meteorologists
Muhajir people
Pakistan Air Force civilians
Pakistan Air Force officers
Pakistani civil servants
Pakistani nuclear physicists
Pakistani expatriates in the United Kingdom
Pakistani expatriates in the United States
Pakistani inventors
Pakistani meteorologists
Pakistani physicists
Pakistani scholars
Pakistani scientists
Pakistani textbook writers
Pashtun people
People from Hoshiarpur
Project-706
Punjabi people
Academic staff of Quaid-i-Azam University
Delhi University alumni
University of Karachi alumni
Academic staff of the University of Karachi
Academic staff of the University of the Punjab
University of Sindh alumni
Academic staff of the University of Sindh